The Court at 940-948 North Raymond Avenue is a bungalow court located at 940-948 North Raymond Avenue in Pasadena, California.

Owner H. R. Pompeyon built the court in 1929.

The court consists of five homes arranged on both sides of a narrow courtyard. Architect N. S. Bungus designed the houses in the Spanish Colonial Revival style. The homes feature stucco walls, clay tile roofs, arched entrances, wrought iron light fixtures, and ceramic tilework.

The court was added to the National Register of Historic Places on November 15, 1994.

References

Bungalow courts
Houses in Pasadena, California
Houses completed in 1929
Houses on the National Register of Historic Places in California
Historic districts on the National Register of Historic Places in California
National Register of Historic Places in Pasadena, California
American Craftsman architecture in California
1929 establishments in California
Spanish Colonial Revival architecture in California